Ila Marshall Cronin (1893-1955) was a former member of the Ohio House of Representatives from Columbiana County.

References

Republican Party members of the Ohio House of Representatives
Women state legislators in Ohio
Year of death missing
1893 births
People from East Liverpool, Ohio